Fadhuwa Zahir {; born 7 May 1987) is a Maldivian footballer who plays as a striker.

Career

In 2014, Zahir signed for Swedish side Själevad. In 2019, she received the National Award of Encouragement.

International goals

References

1986 births
Expatriate women's footballers in Sweden
Living people
Women's association football forwards
Maldivian women's footballers